Cherry Filter (체리 필터) is a South Korean rock group formed in 1997. Their unique sound - consisting of emotional ballads, punk rock, rave and trance -  prevalent in their last two albums has given them fame across South Korea.  The song "낭만 고양이" (Nangman Goyang-i, "Romantic Cat") from the album Made In Korea made Cherry Filter famous.

When Cherry Filter was first formed, everyone was curious about the meaning of the name "Cherry Filter".  Youjeen stated in an interview, she wanted a name that expressed both femininity and masculinity, a filter representing masculinity and the cherry representing femininity.  The band includes Cho Youjeen as the vocalist - who branched off into a solo career for 2 years in Japan, then returned to Cherry Filter - Jojinbo on guitar, Yaenhead on bass, and Sonstar on drums.

Current members
Jung Woo-jin (born April 20, 1976) is the leader and the guitarist of the group. Yungeun (born September 21, 1976) plays the bass. Sonstar (born January 13, 1977) plays the drums and raps in several songs. Youjeen (born July 5, 1977) is Cherry Filter's vocalist.

Youjeen
In 2001, Youjeen temporarily left Cherry Filter to pursue a solo career in Japan, where she released music with the help of Luna Sea member J and former Foo Fighters guitarist Franz Stahl. She released five singles and two albums over the course of two years. After the release of her second Japanese album BEWITCH, through Teichiku Records, Youjeen ceased activities in the Japanese music scene. She is still active in South Korea as part of Cherry Filter.

In 2022, Youjeen featured on the single "Wild Flower" by RM of BTS, and earned her first entry on a Billboard chart when it debuted at number 83 on the Hot 100 in the United States.

Discography

Studio albums
 1 - April 14, 2000: Volume 1 - HEAD-UP
 2 - August 13, 2002: Volume 2 - Made in Korea
 3 - September 3, 2003: Volume 3 - The Third Eye
 4 - July 7, 2006: Volume 4 - Peace 'N' Rock 'N' Roll
 5 - September 17, 2007: Rewind (Remake cover album)
 6 - August 27, 2009: Volume 5 - Rock steric

Singles
 May 24, 2004: Digital single- 너는 나를 지나쳐 (You Passed Me By)
 August 1, 2008: Digital single- Orange Road
 July 7, 2010: Digital single- WM7
 May 11, 2014: Digital single - Andromeda

o.s.t 
 march 10, 2015~ January 6, 2016 : Tobot Op go tobot

Indie
 1998 A Pirate Radio [V.A]
 1999 Open the Door [V.A]

Awards 
 2002 sbs Korean pop award - Rock
 2002 the 13th Seoul Korean pop award - Rock
 2003 sbs Korean Korean pop award - Rock
 2003 the 14th Seoul Korean pop award - Rock
 2003 Mnet Asian Music Awards - Best Rock Performance for "Flying Duck"
 2003 KMTV Korean Music award - Rock
 2003 KBS Korean pop award - The band of the year for teenagers
 2003 the 18th Goldendisk awards - Rock
 2007 M.net KM Music Festival - Best Rock Performance
 2008 Mtv Video Music Award Japan BuzzASIA from Korea)

References

External links 
  

Music Farm artists
K-pop music groups
South Korean indie rock groups
South Korean co-ed groups
MAMA Award winners